Robert Harwood (1826–1897) was a Quebec politician.

Robert Harwood may also refer to:

Robert Harwood (cricketer) (1923–1992), New Zealand cricketer
Robert B. Harwood (1902–1991), justice of the Alabama Supreme Court
Robert Unwin Harwood (1798–1863), last Seigneur of Vaudreuil

See also
Robert Harward (disambiguation)